Montenero can refer to:

 Montenero di Bisaccia, town and municipality in the Province of Campobasso, region of Molise, Italy
 Montenero d'Orcia, village of the comune of Castel del Piano, province of Grosseto Tuscany, central Italy
 Montenero Sabino, comune (municipality) in the Province of Rieti in the Italian region Latium,
 Montenero Val Cocchiara, town and comune in the Province of Isernia, in the Molise region, southern Italy
 Circuito del Montenero, a Grand Prix motor racing road course located at the southern outskirts of Livorno, Italy
 Sanctuary of Montenero, religious complex on the Monte Nero Livorno Hills, in Livorno, central Italy
 Coppa Montenero, an automobile race held in Italy

See also
 Montenegro (disambiguation)